Varsha Soni (from  Jaipur, Rajasthan) was a member of the Indian Women's Hockey Team. She was raised in Jaipur, Rajasthan and is the youngest of 7 sisters and 1 brother. She studied at University Maharani College, University of Rajasthan, Jaipur.  She started her career in Field Hockey at an early age and eventually made it onto the Indian national team where she represented India at the 1980 Summer Olympics and the 1982 Asian Games. She worked for the Indian Railways in Jaipur and is also a recipient of the Arjuna Award.

References
sports-reference

External links

Field hockey players from Jaipur
Olympic field hockey players of India
Field hockey players at the 1980 Summer Olympics
Indian female field hockey players
Rajasthani people
Recipients of the Arjuna Award
1957 births
Living people
Sportswomen from Rajasthan
20th-century Indian women
20th-century Indian people
Asian Games medalists in field hockey
Field hockey players at the 1982 Asian Games
Asian Games gold medalists for India
Medalists at the 1982 Asian Games